Swamp Water is a 1941 American film noir crime film directed by Jean Renoir and starring Walter Brennan and Walter Huston. Based on the novel by Vereen Bell, it was produced at 20th Century Fox. The film was shot on location at Okefenokee Swamp, Waycross, Georgia, USA. It was Renoir's first American film. The film was remade in 1952 as Lure of the Wilderness, directed by Jean Negulesco.

Plot 
A local man, Ben (Dana Andrews) encounters a fugitive Tom Keefer (Walter Brennan) from a murder charge while hunting in the Okefenokee Swamp looking for his dog. The two form a partnership in which Ben sells the animals hunted and trapped by both until townsfolk become suspicious. Also, Ben helps Julie, Keefer's daughter, who is living in straitened circumstances clean up and look more decent. Keefer is accused of murdering Deputy Shep Collins, but it was really the Dorson brothers who did so and then perjured themselves in evidence against Tom Keefer, assisted by Jesse Wick. Ben makes Wick confess so that Keefer will not be blamed anymore. He tries to take Keefer back to town where he can live a normal life, but they are shot at by the Dorson brothers. One of them sinks in a mudhole, and Keefer talks to the other man, saying he wants a normal life, and lets him go into the swamp. Ben and Keefer are found by the townsfolk. Once back in town, Keefer cleans up, and goes to the dance, smiling.

Cast 
Walter Brennan as Tom Keefer
Walter Huston as Thursday Ragan
Anne Baxter as Julie
Dana Andrews as Ben
Virginia Gilmore as Mabel MacKenzie
John Carradine as Jesse Wick
Mary Howard as Hannah
Eugene Pallette as Sheriff Jeb McKane
Ward Bond as Tim Dorson
Guinn 'Big Boy' Williams as Bud Dorson (as Guinn Williams)
Russell Simpson as Marty McCord
Joe Sawyer as Hardy Ragan (as Joseph Sawyer)
Paul E. Burns as Tulle McKenzie (as Paul Burns)
Dave Morris as Barber
Frank Austin as Fred Ulm
Matt Willis as Miles Tonkin
Mae Marsh as Mrs. McCord (uncredited)

Production
The film was shot on location at Okefenokee Swamp, Waycross, Georgia, and was Renoir's first American film. Renoir found it difficult to adapt to efficient Hollywood shooting standards, insisting on allowing a large number of takes from the actors. Renoir claimed in his autobiography that due to overindulgence he was fired by Zanuck one morning and rehired the same evening.

Reception 

Although Renoir had difficulty adapting to Hollywood production methods, the film was popular at the box office and made a profit. "Red River Valley" was the main theme song.

Dave Kehr of The New York Times noted that the "crude wooden cross, planted in a shallow channel and topped with a human skull" in the film was a "strikingly morbid image for the usually warm and optimistic Renoir", and testament to it being a difficult time for him. He concluded that Swamp Water "may not represent the film that Renoir wanted to make", but is "no less fascinating as the film that Renoir was able to make — at that point in his life and at that point in history". Jonathan Rosenbaum of the Chicago Reader concurred, commenting that despite the production setbacks, the film has "certain beauties and pleasures". Time Out thought the film looked "a bit drab and unbelievable" despite the location filming, describing it as "a rather sullen affair set in a Georgia swamp which harbours snakes, alligators, mud, and Walter Brennan, a fugitive criminal with whom the hero (Andrews) becomes strangely and melodramatically involved."

Film critic Raymond Durgnat wrote: "In certain aspects, Swamp Water compromises between a Western and Toni. It resembles the former in that violence is consistent and integral rather than spasmodic and, as it were, incidental. Yet the integration of violence and communal emotion is simpler than in the tortuous constructions of William Faulkner."  Durgnat thought that Anne Baxter's character was reminiscent of Gene Tierney's in Tobacco Road. Several critics, including Dennis Schwartz, noticed that the casting was typical of a John Ford western. Schwartz praised Andrews's performance, but wrote: "Even though it is only one of Renoir's lesser films, thanks to the interference by Zanuck, it still was one of Fox's highest grossing films of 1941. But if you ever wondered or cared why so many Hollywood films suck, this film should give you a strong hint why." He awarded it a B grade.

Influence 
The narrative elements of the 2012 coming-of-age film Mud, directed by Jeff Nichols and starring Matthew McConaughey, have been compared to those of Swamp Water.

References 
Novel and film information

External links 

1941 films
1941 drama films
20th Century Fox films
American black-and-white films
Film noir
American drama films
Films based on American novels
Films directed by Jean Renoir
Films scored by David Buttolph
Films set in Georgia (U.S. state)
Films shot in Georgia (U.S. state)
Films with screenplays by Dudley Nichols
Southern Gothic films
Films about capital punishment
Films about prison escapes
1940s English-language films
1940s American films